The following is a list of the CHUM Chart number-one singles of 1959.

See also
1959 in music

References

1959
Canada Chum
1959 in Canadian music